Sandlot Games was a developer and publisher of casual and family-friendly games based in Bothell, Washington, United States. It was founded in 2002 by Daniel Bernstein.

The Sandlot Games portfolio consisted of franchises like Cake Mania, Westward, Kuros, Super Granny, Slyder, and Tradewinds. Although most of its products were downloadable PC games, it offered other titles for PlayStation 2, Mac, iPhone, iPod, Wii, Nintendo DS, Palm OS and PSP.

In August 2011, Sandlot Games was acquired by Digital Chocolate as a fully owned subsidiary. In 2014, Digital Chocolate sold its games to RockYou, which in turn went bankrupt in 2019.

Distribution channels 
On January 7, 2009, Intenium, Germany's leading distributor of casual games, announced that it entered into a distribution partnership with Sandlot Games. A total of 12 titles from Sandlot Games launched to several European regions.

In July 2009, Sandlot Games entered into a distribution partnership with Steam, Valve's digital distribution platform. Its games were part of Steam's foray into a family games category.

Awards 
 "Best Casual Game of the Year 2006: Cake Mania" by Logler.com.
 "Best of 2008: Best Use of Accelerometer - Snail Mail" by IGN
 "Most Successful Developer/Publisher 2006" (2nd Place) by Logler.com.
 "Longest Run in Top 10 2006: Cake Mania" by Logler.com.
 "Casual Game of the Year 2006: Cake Mania" by Yahoo! Games.

Games 
Since its inception in 2002, Sandlot Games developed and published the following games:

 Ballhalla
 Ballistik
 Barnyard Invasion
 Boonka
 Cake Mania
 Cake Mania: Back to the Bakery
 Cake Mania 2
 Cake Mania 3
 Cake Mania: Main Street
 Cake Mania: Lights, Camera, Action!
 Cake Mania: To the Max!
 Cake Mania 7: New Generation (Cancelled in 2011)
 Dr Blob's Organism
 Eye for Design
 Fashion Forward
 Glyph
 Glyph 2
 Heartwild Solitaire
 Incrediball
 Kuros
 Monster Mash
 Orbital (Discontinued)
 Pirate Island
 Snail Mail
 Super Granny
 Granny in Paradise
 Super Granny Winter Wonderland
 Super Granny 3
 Super Granny 4
 Super Granny 5
 Super Granny 6
 Slyder
 Super Slyder
 Slyder Adventures
 Sphera
 Tradewinds Classic
 Tradewinds 2
 Tradewinds Caravans
 Tradewinds Legends
 Tradewinds Legends Unlikely Heroes
 Tradewinds Odyssey
 Westward
 Westward II
 Westward III
 Westward IV
 Westward Kingdoms
 Word Monaco

References

External links 
 Sandlot Games official website

Macintosh software companies
Companies based in Seattle
Video game companies established in 2002
Video game companies of the United States
Video game development companies
Video game publishers
2002 establishments in Washington (state)
Monolith Productions